Copa dos Campeões (Portuguese for Brazilian Champions Cup) was a Brazilian football competition, organized by the Brazilian Football Confederation (CBF), contested by the best teams from each one of the regional cups.

The Copa dos Campeões winner was automatically qualified to following year's Copa Libertadores.

In 1968, Grêmio Maringá won a similar competition, named Torneio dos Campeões da CBD.

Regional cups
These were the regional cups that granted qualification to the Copa dos Campeões:

Campeonato do Nordeste
Copa Centro-Oeste
Copa Norte
Copa Sul-Minas
Torneio Rio-São Paulo

Format
In 2000, and in 2001, the competition was contested by eight clubs, in a two-leg playoff system. There was a preliminary stage called triangular, disputed by the champions of Copa Centro-Oeste and Copa Norte, and the Campeonato do Nordeste runner-up. Those teams played against each other once, and the two best teams qualified to the first stage.

In 2002, the competition was contested by sixteen clubs. In the first stage, the clubs were divided in four groups of four teams each. The two best placed clubs of each group qualified to the quarterfinals, which was disputed in two legs. The semifinals were disputed in one leg, and the final was disputed in two legs. All matches were played in cities located in Northeastern and Northern cities.

List of champions

Note 1: Losing semi-finalists are listed in alphabetical order.

References

External links
RSSSF

Camp